Ronidovirineae is a suborder of enveloped positive-strand RNA viruses in the order Nidovirales which infect arthropods. Host organisms include crustaceans such as shrimp.

Taxonomy

The suborder has two families and three subfamilies:
Euroniviridae
Ceronivirinae
Charybnivirus
Crustonivirinae
Paguronivirus
Roniviridae
Okanivirinae

Phylogenetic tree of Ronidovirineae:

References

Virus suborders
Nidovirales